Jiminy Glick in Lalawood is a 2004 American comedy film starring Martin Short as Jiminy Glick, a morbidly obese movie critic who is involved in a murder case at the Toronto International Film Festival.  The supporting cast features Jan Hooks, Matthew Gray Gubler, Linda Cardellini, Mo Collins and Aries Spears, and numerous cinema luminaries play themselves, such as  Willem Dafoe, Whoopi Goldberg, Jake Gyllenhaal, Kevin Kline, Rob Lowe, Steve Martin, Kurt Russell, Susan Sarandon, Chloë Sevigny, Sharon Stone, Kiefer Sutherland and Forest Whitaker.

Plot
Jiminy Glick in Lalawood starts off as an Entertainment Tonight or Access Hollywood spoof, but develops into a murder mystery, with David Lynch played by Martin Short as a makeshift Hercule Poirot.

Jiminy Glick (also played by Short) checks into a spooky hotel where Lynch is at the bar, spouting random scenes for his new movie. Glick hits the spotlight when he gets to interview Ben Di Carlo (Corey Pearson), who is starring in an indie flick called Growing Up Gandhi. This movie is a tale of Gandhi's rise as a prize fighter in the boxing rings of India. The film and its star are not well received, except for Glick who slept through the screening.

After this scoop, Glick gets another prize interview with Miranda Coolidge (Elizabeth Perkins), who becomes the key figure in the murder mystery. Coolidge is starring in a lesbian sexploitation movie called African Queens (a takeoff of The African Queen), but is soon involved in the aforementioned murder.

Glick conducts interviews with real stars like Steve Martin, Kurt Russell, and red carpet interviews with Kiefer Sutherland, Whoopi Goldberg, Sharon Stone, and Jake Gyllenhaal. Jiminy gets kidnapped by Randall Bookerton (Gary Anthony Williams), a local hip hop recording artist, who wants his animated film, The Littlest Roach, to win Best Picture. Jiminy also becomes a suspect in Miranda Coolidge's "murder". He and Dixie (Jan Hooks) retrieve his cell phone, which mysteriously appears in Miranda's room.

Jiminy thinks that Andre (John Michael Higgins) is covering up her murder. David Lynch appears and tells the Glicks what happened. It is revealed that Natalie (Linda Cardellini), Miranda's daughter, killed her girlfriend Dee Dee (Janeane Garofalo) who was having an affair with Andre, her mother's agent. Dee Dee disguises herself as Miranda in case she got drunk and upset. Glick mistakes her for the real Miranda and passes out in her bedroom. Andre calls some "former business associates" to dispose of Dee Dee's body. Natalie stabs Andre in anger over his affair with Dee Dee.

Natalie goes to jail for 20 years. The future of the film festival is uncertain, and Miranda is considering retirement. Randall Bookerton and his posse are happy to receive an award for their film. Glick, meanwhile, realizes that celebrities can be dull, after interviewing actor Rob Lowe, ending the film. During the credits, bloopers and outtakes are seen with Jiminy interviewing Kurt Russell and Steve Martin.

Cast (in credits order)

Martin Short as Jiminy Glick / David Lynch
Jan Hooks as Dixie Glick
Linda Cardellini as Natalie Coolidge
Janeane Garofalo as Dee Dee
John Michael Higgins as Andre Devine
Elizabeth Perkins as Miranda Coolidge
Larry Joe Campbell as Haygood Lewkin
Mo Collins as Sharon
Carlos Jacott as Barry King
Corey Pearson as Ben DiCarlo
Aries Spears as Gunnar "MC GUN" Jorge
Robert Trebor as Jay Schiffer
Gary Anthony Williams as Randall Bookerton
Landon Hansen as Matthew Glick
Alex Diakun as Bellhop/Barber
Peter Breck as Tibor
Ellie Harvie as June
Darren Shahlavi as Johnny Stompanato
Courtney Andersen as Lana Turner
Randi Lynne as Rowena
Olivia Yung as Chinese Maid
Ari Solomon as Rabbi Schleckman
Christine Willes as Arlene Sheehy
Susan Gillan as Hotel Clerk
Peter Kelamis as Hotel Clerk
Zahf Paroo as Gandhi's Manager
Allison Warnyca as Gandhi's Girlfriend
Natasha Wilson as Sexy Girl
Jano Frandsen as Award Presenter
Anira Brown as Award Presenter
Christopher Lazar as Rap Fan
Sara Willey as Lana Turner’s Daughter

Cast appearing as themselves

Willem Dafoe
Whoopi Goldberg
Jake Gyllenhaal
Kevin Kline
Rob Lowe
Steve Martin
Kurt Russell
Susan Sarandon
Chloë Sevigny
Sharon Stone
Kiefer Sutherland
Forest Whitaker

External links

2004 comedy films
2004 films
American comedy films
Films directed by Vadim Jean
Films shot in Toronto
Films set in Toronto
Toronto International Film Festival
Gold Circle Films films
Metro-Goldwyn-Mayer films
Films produced by Peter Safran
2000s English-language films
2000s American films